Augusto da Costa (22 October 1920  –  1 March 2004), sometimes known as just Augusto, was a Brazilian footballer who played for the Brazil national football team. He captained the Brazil team to the 1950 FIFA World Cup final leading them to become the runners-up of the tournament after losing to Uruguay. He was born in Rio de Janeiro. He started his career in 1936, with São Cristóvão, leaving the club in 1944. In 1945 he joined Vasco, retiring in 1954. He played 18 games for the Brazil national team and scored one goal.

References

1920 births
2004 deaths
Footballers from Rio de Janeiro (city)
Brazilian footballers
Brazil international footballers
CR Vasco da Gama players
1950 FIFA World Cup players
Copa América-winning players
Association football defenders